Accordion Crimes is a 1996 novel by American writer E. Annie Proulx. It followed her Pulitzer Prize-winning 1993 work The Shipping News and was shortlisted for the 1997 Orange Broadband Prize for Fiction.

Plot details
The novel begins in the nineteenth century, as a Sicilian accordion-maker comes to the United States in search of better opportunities. He is shot by an anti-Italian lynch mob, and his accordion falls into the hands of several other owners, many of whom meet painful ends themselves. The accordion traverses a continent, traveling to Louisiana, Iowa, Texas, Maine, Illinois, Montana, and Mississippi.

Theater
Accordion Crimes inspired a play called Vaarallinen Harmonikka (Dangerous Accordion) in Finland. Writer Seppo Parkkinen and director Fiikka Forsman adapted the novel for the Turku City Theatre. The play premiered on September 9, 2011.

References

External links
Accordion Crimes at the Literary Encyclopedia
Magill Book Review of Accordion Crimes
"Vaarallinen Harmonikka" at Turku City Theater

1996 American novels
Works by Annie Proulx
Novels about music
American novels adapted into plays
Charles Scribner's Sons books